The Annasaheb Magar Sports Stadium is a multi purposed stadium in the city of Pune, India. The stadium is owned and managed by the PCMC Administration. The ground was named after  Indian National Congress leader Annasaheb Magar who was Member of Parliament from 1977 to 1980 from Khed.

The stadium is meant to play for seven different game and located in 5 acres and has facilities like  pavilion, toilets and a boundary size of approx. 65–70 metres. The ground faced a major problem of facilities sports facilities available in the stadium are defunct.

This sports complex is also home to one of 10 swimming pools, The Annasaheb Magar Swimming Pool.

See also 

 PCMC Hockey Stadium

External links 

 Wikimapia

References

Sports venues in Pimpri-Chinchwad
Sports venues in Maharashtra
Field hockey venues in India
Buildings and structures in Pimpri-Chinchwad
Year of establishment missing